Osmorhiza brachypoda is a species of flowering plant in the family Apiaceae known by the common name California sweetcicely.

Description

The green leaves have blades up to 20 centimeters long which are divided into toothed or lobed leaflets. The blade is borne on a long petiole.

The inflorescence is a compound umbel of many tiny greenish yellow flowers at the tip of a stemlike peduncle. The narrow, elongated fruit is ribbed and bristly, measuring up to 2 centimeters long.

Distribution and habitat
Habitats include chaparral and woodlands and coniferous forests.

It is found in the Southern California Coast Ranges, Transverse Ranges, Peninsular Ranges, and the central and southern Sierra Nevada foothills.

Ecology
This is the only known host plant for the California endemic moth Greya suffusca.

References

External links
Jepson Manual Treatment of Osmorhiza brachypoda
USDA Plants Profile for Osmorhiza brachypoda (California sweet cicely)
NatureServe Explorer
Osmorhiza brachypoda — CalPhotos photo gallery

brachypoda
Flora of Arizona
Flora of California
Flora of the Sierra Nevada (United States)
Natural history of the California chaparral and woodlands
Natural history of the California Coast Ranges
Natural history of the Peninsular Ranges
Natural history of the San Francisco Bay Area
Natural history of the Transverse Ranges
Butterfly food plants